Spatoglossum is a marine brown algal genus in the family Dictyotaceae, with a worldwide distribution

For a description, see Spatoglossum Kützing, 1843.

Some accepted species
According to Algaebase:
Spatoglossum asperum  J.Agardh 
Spatoglossum australasicum  Kützing 
Spatoglossum chapmanii  Lindauer
Spatoglossum chaudhrianum  P.Anand
Spatoglossum crassum  J.Tanaka
Spatoglossum crispatum  M.Howe
Spatoglossum dichotomum  C.K.Tseng & Lu Baoren
Spatoglossum ecuadoreanum  W.R.Taylor
Spatoglossum flabelliforme  Kützing
Spatoglossum howellii  Setchell & N.L.Gardner
Spatoglossum intermedium  Kützing
Spatoglossum lanceolatum  E.Y.Dawson
Spatoglossum latum  J.Tanaka
Spatoglossum macrodontum  J.Agardh
Spatoglossum membranaceum  Kraft
Spatoglossum schmittii  W.R.Taylor
Spatoglossum schroederi  (C.Agardh) Kützing
Spatoglossum solieri  (Chauvin ex Montagne) Kützing - (type)
Spatoglossum spanneri  (Meneghini) Meneghini
Spatoglossum stipitatum  (Tanaka & K.Nozawa) Bittner et al.
Spatoglossum subflabellatum E.Y.Dawson
Spatoglossum variabile Figari & De Notaris
Spatoglossum vietnamense Pham-Hoàng Hô

References

External links
Spatoglossum occurrence data from GBIF

Flora of New Zealand
Dictyotaceae
Brown algae genera